Below is the list of populated places in Uşak Province, Turkey by the districts. In the following lists first place in each list is the administrative center of the district.

Uşak
	Uşak
	Akbulak, Uşak
	Aktaş, Uşak
	Alanyurt, Uşak
	Altıntaş, Uşak
	Bağbaşı, Uşak
	Belkaya, Uşak
	Beylerhan, Uşak
	Boyalı, Uşak
	Bozköy, Uşak
	Bozkuş, Uşak
	Bölme, Uşak
	Buğdaylı, Uşak
	Ciğerdede, Uşak
	Çamyazı, Uşak
	Çamyuva, Uşak
	Çarık, Uşak
	Çatalbayır, Uşak
	Çevre, Uşak
	Çınarcık, Uşak
	Çukurağıl, Uşak
	Dağdemirler, Uşak
	Dağyenice, Uşak
	Demirören, Uşak
	Derbent, Uşak
	Dışkaya, Uşak
	Eğlence, Uşak
	Elmacık, Uşak
	Emirfakı, Uşak
	Eskigüney, Uşak
	Eskisaray, Uşak
	Eynihan, Uşak
	Fakılı, Uşak
	Göğem, Uşak
	Gökçedal, Uşak
	Gökçetepe, Uşak
	Gücer, Uşak
	Güneli, Uşak
	Güre, Uşak
	Hacıkadem, Uşak
	Halilefendiçiftliği, Uşak
	Hisar, Uşak
	Hocalar, Uşak
	İkisaray, Uşak
	İlyaslı, Uşak
	Kabaklar, Uşak
	Kalfa, Uşak
	Kapancık, Uşak
	Karaağaç, Uşak
	Karabeyli, Uşak
	Karacahisar, Uşak
	Karahasan, Uşak
	Karaköse, Uşak
	Karakuyu, Uşak
	Karlık, Uşak
	Kaşbelen, Uşak
	Kayağıl, Uşak
	Kediyünü, Uşak
	Kılcan, Uşak
	Kırka, Uşak
	Kısık, Uşak
	Koyunbeyli, Uşak
	Köprübaşı, Uşak
	Kuyucak, Uşak
	Mesudiye, Uşak
	Mollamusa, Uşak
	Muharremşah, Uşak
	Ormandamı, Uşak
	Ortabağ, Uşak
	Ortaköy, Uşak
	Ovademirler, Uşak
	Örencik, Uşak
	Paçacılar, Uşak
	Sarıdere, Uşak
	Selikler, Uşak
	Selviler, Uşak
	Selvioğlu, Uşak
	Sorkun, Uşak
	Susuzören, Uşak
	Şükraniye, Uşak
	Taşkonak, Uşak
	Ulucak, Uşak
	Üçkuyular, Uşak
	Ürün, Uşak
	Yapağılar, Uşak
	Yaşamışlar, Uşak
	Yavi, Uşak
	Yeniköy, Uşak
	Yenişehir, Uşak
	Yeşildere, Uşak
	Yoncalı, Uşak
	Zahman, Uşak

Banaz
	Banaz		
	Ahat, Banaz		
	Alaba, Banaz		
	Ayrancı, Banaz		
	Ayvacık, Banaz		
	Bağkonak, Banaz		
	Bahadır, Banaz		
	Balcıdamı, Banaz		
	Baltalı, Banaz		
	Banaz (village), Banaz		
	Burhaniye, Banaz		
	Büyükoturak, Banaz		
	Corum, Banaz		
	Çamsu, Banaz		
	Çiftlik, Banaz		
	Çöğürlü, Banaz		
	Derbent, Banaz		
	Dümenler, Banaz		
	Düzkışla, Banaz		
	Düzlüce, Banaz		
	Gedikler, Banaz		
	Güllüçam, Banaz		
	Gürlek, Banaz		
	Halaçlar, Banaz		
	Hasanköy, Banaz		
	Hatıplar, Banaz		
	Kaplangı, Banaz		
	Karacahisar, Banaz		
	Karaköse, Banaz		
	Kavacık, Banaz		
	Kayılı, Banaz		
	Kızılcaören, Banaz		
	Kızılcasöğüt, Banaz		
	Kızılhisar, Banaz		
	Kuşdemir, Banaz		
	Küçükler, Banaz		
	Küçükoturak, Banaz		
	Muratlı, Banaz		
	Ovacık, Banaz		
	Öksüz, Banaz		
	Paşacık, Banaz		
	Reşadiye, Banaz		
	Susuz, Banaz		
	Şaban, Banaz		
	Ulupınar, Banaz		
	Yazıtepe, Banaz		
	Yenice, Banaz		
	Yeşilyurt, Banaz

Eşme
       Eşme
	Ağabey, Eşme
	Ahmetler, Eşme
	Akçaköy, Eşme
	Alahabalı, Eşme
	Alıçlı, Eşme
	Araplar, Eşme
	Armutlu, Eşme
	Aydınlı, Eşme
	Balabancı, Eşme
	Bekişli, Eşme
	Bozlar, Eşme
	Caberler, Eşme
	Camili, Eşme
	Cemalçavuş, Eşme
	Cevizli, Eşme
	Çalıkhasan, Eşme
	Çaykışla, Eşme
	Davutlar, Eşme
	Delibaşlı, Eşme
	Dereköy, Eşme
	Dereli, Eşme
	Dervişli, Eşme
	Emirli, Eşme
	Eşmeli, Eşme
	Eşmetaş, Eşme
	Gökçukur, Eşme
	Güllü, Eşme
	Güllübağ, Eşme
	Güney, Eşme
	Günyaka, Eşme
	Hamamdere, Eşme
	Hardallı, Eşme
	İsalar, Eşme
	Kandemirler, Eşme
	Karaahmetli, Eşme
	Karabacaklı, Eşme
	Karacaömerli, Eşme
	Katrancılar, Eşme
	Kayalı, Eşme
	Kayapınar, Eşme
	Kazaklar, Eşme
	Keklikli, Eşme
	Kıranköy, Eşme
	Kocabey, Eşme
	Kolankaya, Eşme
	Konak, Eşme
	Köseler, Eşme
	Köylüoğlu, Eşme
	Manavlı, Eşme
	Narıncalı, Eşme
	Narlı, Eşme
	Oymalı, Eşme
	Poslu, Eşme
	Saraycık, Eşme
	Şehitli, Eşme
	Takmak, Eşme
	Uluyayla, Eşme
	Yaylaköy, Eşme
	Yeleğen, Eşme
	Yeniköy, Eşme
	Yeşilkavak, Eşme

Karahallı
	Karahallı
	Alfaklar, Karahallı
	Beki, Karahallı
	Buğdaylı, Karahallı
	Coğuplu, Karahallı
	Çokaklı, Karahallı
	Delihıdırlı, Karahallı
	Dumanlı, Karahallı
	Duraklı, Karahallı
	Karayakuplu, Karahallı
	Karbasan, Karahallı
	Kavaklı, Karahallı
	Kaykıllı, Karahallı
	Kırkyaren, Karahallı
	Külköy, Karahallı
	Paşalar, Karahallı

Sivaslı
	Sivaslı
	Ağaçbeyli, Sivaslı
	Akarca, Sivaslı
	Azizler, Sivaslı
	Budaklar, Sivaslı
	Cinoğlan, Sivaslı
	Eldeniz, Sivaslı
	Erice, Sivaslı
	Hacim, Sivaslı
	Hanoğlu, Sivaslı
	Karaboyalık, Sivaslı
	Ketenlik, Sivaslı
	Kökez, Sivaslı
	Özbeyli, Sivaslı
	Pınarbaşı, Sivaslı
	Salmanlar, Sivaslı
	Samatlar, Sivaslı
	Sazak, Sivaslı
	Selçikler, Sivaslı
	Tatar, Sivaslı
	Yayalar, Sivaslı
	Yenierice, Sivaslı

Ulubey
	Ulubey
	Akkeçili, Ulubey
	Aksaz, Ulubey
	Avgan, Ulubey
	Bekdemir, Ulubey
	Büyükkayalı, Ulubey
	Çamdere, Ulubey
	Çamlıbel, Ulubey
	Çardak, Ulubey
	Çırpıcılar, Ulubey
	Dutluca, Ulubey
	Gedikler, Ulubey
	Gümüşkol, Ulubey
	Hanyeri, Ulubey
	Hasköy, Ulubey
	İnay, Ulubey
	İshaklar, Ulubey
	Karacaahmet, Ulubey
	Kıran, Ulubey
	Kışla, Ulubey
	Köseler, Ulubey
	Kurudere, Ulubey
	Küçükilyaslı, Ulubey
	Küçükkayalı, Ulubey
	Külçen, Ulubey
	Omurca, Ulubey
	Söğütlü, Ulubey
	Sülümenli, Ulubey

References

Usak
List